Google Māori is a Māori-led initiative which was made possible by Google's popular Google in Your Language initiative, which saw the translation of Google's homepage translated into te reo Māori.

Background

Around the time the Google in Your Language program began, Craig Nevill-Manning, the New Zealand computer scientist who developed Froogle reached out to a former colleague at Waikato University, Dr. Te Taka Keegan, with the idea of translating Google into Māori. While working on his doctorate, Te Taka began the translation effort in his spare time. Over the course of the next six years, with the help of several other volunteers, he had covered 68% of the messages.

In 2007 TangataWhenua.com's husband-and-wife team of Potaua and Nikolasa Biasiny-Tule began to project manage the initiative.  As project managers they initiated the support of the Māori Language Commission and dozens of volunteers, leading ultimately to all translations being completed within a year—just in time for te Wiki o te Reo Māori (Māori Language Week) 2008.

In total more than 1,600 phrases, totaling more than 8,500 words, had been translated.

Launch

Google Māori was launched during te Wiki o Te Reo Māori in 2008 at Te Wānanga o Aotearoa, in Rotorua. Google sent two representatives to the event, which was widely covered by national and global media.

About Google in Your Language

The Google in Your Language initiative is in line with Google's overall mission of making the world's information accessible in as many languages as possible. The program began in 2001 and is designed to give anyone the tools to translate Google services into languages in which they are fluent, as a result the Google homepage now appears in more than 100 languages.

References and sources

External links
 Search Google in te reo Maori | Google
  | TVNZ

New Zealand websites
Maori
Māori language
Internet properties established in 2008
Māori mass media